The 1926 All-Ireland Senior Hurling Championship Final was the 39th All-Ireland Final and the culmination of the 1926 All-Ireland Senior Hurling Championship, an inter-county hurling tournament for the top teams in Ireland. The match was held at Croke Park, Dublin, on 24 October 1926 between Cork and Kilkenny. The Leinster champions lost to their Munster opponents on a score line of 4-6 to 2-0.

Match details

1
All-Ireland Senior Hurling Championship Finals
Cork county hurling team matches
Kilkenny GAA matches
All-Ireland Senior Hurling Championship Final
All-Ireland Senior Hurling Championship Final, 1926